Paul Couture (April 15, 1833 – November 30, 1913) was a dairy farmer and political figure in Quebec. He represented Chicoutimi—Saguenay in the House of Commons of Canada from 1887 to 1891 as an Independent member.

He was born in Saint-Charles, Bellechasse County, Lower Canada. In 1857, he married Philomène Boulanger. He operated a butter and cheese factory at Laterrière; Couture established this facility in 1883 with his brother Octave as a model facility to educate others in the region in the production of butter. He was also involved in the production of wool.

References 

The Canadian parliamentary companion, 1889 AJ Gemmill

1833 births
1913 deaths
Members of the House of Commons of Canada from Quebec